Air guard may refer to:

 Air National Guard, part of the US air force
 Civil Air Guard
 T&T Air Guard, branch of Trinidad and Tobago Defence Force
 Air Guard, air rescue service Rega (Switzerland)
 Chrislea Airguard, 1930s British two-seat cabin monoplane
 Chengdu F-7M Airguard, China's license-built version of the MiG-21